Mario De Simoni (3 November 1887 – May 1967) was an Italian footballer who played as a goalkeeper. He represented the Italy national football team seven times, the first being in Italy's first ever match on 15 May 1910, the occasion of a friendly match against France in a 6–2 home win.

References

1887 births
1967 deaths
Italian footballers
Italy international footballers
Association football goalkeepers
Inter Milan players
A.S.D. Fanfulla managers